The Bronx Chronicle is a century old small local newspaper.

References

External links
 Official website

Daily newspapers published in New York (state)